The Cathedral Church of the Holy and Undivided Trinity is the formal name of a number of cathedrals:
Bristol Cathedral 
Carlisle Cathedral 
Down Cathedral
Ely Cathedral
Norwich Cathedral (more commonly given as "Cathedral of the Holy and Undivided Trinity")
Cathedral of the Most Holy Trinity, Waterford (commonly called "Waterford Cathedral")

See also 
Holy Trinity Cathedral (disambiguation)
Holy Trinity Church (disambiguation)